is a Japanese video game composer best known for her works in the Suikoden series.

Biography
Miki Higashino first began composing video game music as a student employed by Konami and contributed to various minor products, often uncredited or under the alias MIKI-CHAN or MIKI-CHANG. Her substantial early works include the Gradius soundtrack in collaboration with the Konami Kukeiha Club in 1985. Higashino has since been involved in over a dozen projects and compilations.

Aside from being the primary composer for the original Suikoden soundtrack, she also worked on the Suikoden II soundtrack, a 105 track effort which she composed in its entirety save 7 songs by Keiko Fukami and 1 song by Tappy Iwase. In 2001 Higashino left Konami on maternity leave but later collaborated with videogame composer Yasunori Mitsuda in 2005 on the Tsukiyo ni Saraba (Moonlit Shadow) soundtrack. Arranged versions of her original Suikoden music appear on the Suikoden IV and Suikoden V soundtracks.

Musical style and influences
Higashino cites Maurice Ravel, Gabriel Fauré, Lúnasa, and Hevia as musical influences.

Discography
Composer

Gradius (1985)
Yie Ar Kung-Fu (1985)
Salamander (1986)
Life Force (1986)
Knightmare (1986)
Salamander (MSX) (1987) – with Motoaki Furukawa and Masahiro Ikariko
Gradius III (1989) – with Seiichi Fukami, Keizo Nakamura, Mutsuhiko Izumi, and Junichiro Kaneda
Teenage Mutant Ninja Turtles (1989) – with Mutsuhiko Izumi
Surprise Attack (1990) – with Hidenori Maezawa and Keizo Nakamura
Contra III: The Alien Wars (1992) – with Masanori Adachi and Tappi Iwase
Premier Soccer (1993)
Mōryō Senki MADARA 2 (1993) – with Masanori Adachi and Tappi Iwase
Teenage Mutant Ninja Turtles: Tournament Fighters (Mega Drive/Genesis version) (1993)
Double Dribble: The Playoff Edition (1994)
Tokimeki Memorial (1994) – with Mikio Saito, Seiya Murai, and Hiroe Noguchi
Suikoden (1995) – with Tappi Iwase, Hiroshi Tamawari, Setsu Taniguchi, Mayuko Kagesita
Gradius Deluxe Pack (1996) (Staff roll music) – with Akira Yamaoka, Kiyohiko Yamane, and Motoaki Furukawa
Vandal Hearts: Ancient Lost Civilization (1996) – with Hiroshi Tamawari, Kosuke Soeda, Masahiro Yamauchi
Moon: Remix RPG Adventure (1997) – with Hirofumi Taniguchi, Masanori Adachi, Taro Kudou of the Thelonious Monkees
Suikoden II (1998) – with Keiko Fukami
Gensō Suikogaiden Vol. 1 (2000) – with Keiko Fukami
Gensō Suikogaiden Vol. 2 (2001) – with Keiko Fukami
10,000 Bullets (2005) – with Yasunori Mitsuda
Pop'n Music: Adventure (2007)

References

External links
 VGMdb - Miki Higashino
 Artist: Miki Higashino - Composer - OverClocked ReMix
 Interview with Miki Higashino at Our Millennial Fair, the Official Website of Yasunori Mitsuda
 Interview with Miki Higashino at Game Music Online
 

1968 births
21st-century Japanese composers
21st-century Japanese pianists
21st-century jazz composers
21st-century women composers
Freelance musicians
Japanese jazz composers
Japanese jazz pianists
Japanese women composers
Japanese women pianists
Konami people
Living people
Recruit (company)
Video game composers
Women jazz composers
Women jazz pianists
21st-century women pianists